Cynthia Lauren Tewes is an American actress. She played Julie McCoy on the television drama anthology series The Love Boat, which originally aired on ABC from 1977 to 1986.

Early years
Tewes was born in Braddock, Pennsylvania, of German extraction and one of four children, to Joanne (née Woods) and Joseph Robert Tewes, a wood pattern maker. Her early childhood was spent in industrial Trafford, near Pittsburgh before the family moved to Whittier, California, when she was eight. 

Tewes attended Ada S. Nelson Elementary School and Pioneer High School, where she studied drama, winning Best Actress award for three years. Tewes enrolled on an Associate of Arts degree at Rio Hondo College, deciding to major in theatre arts. At college, she won "The Chancellor's Award for Excellence in Theatre", a one-year scholarship which enabled her to transfer to the University of California, Riverside, as a sophomore.

In 1973, when her scholarship expired, Tewes withdrew from college and joined the Pacific Conservatory Theatre in Santa Maria, California, as an apprentice, making her stage debut in Arsenic and Old Lace and The Most Happy Fella before becoming a member of the Birdcage Theatre Company at Knott's Berry Farm, an amusement complex outside Los Angeles.

Career
Tewes' first break came in mid-1974 when she starred in a Lipton Ice Tea commercial, allowing her to join the Screen Actors Guild and register with an agent with the prospect to work on film projects. 

Tewes was soon cast in roles on the prime time TV series Charlie's Angels ("Angels in Chains"), Vega$ (My Darling Daughter), and Family ("Mirror, Mirror on the Wall...") as Jill Redfield, a disenchanted Pasadena debutante. However, it was her role in Starsky & Hutch ("Starsky and Hutch Are Guilty") as Sharon Freemont, an assistant district attorney, which brought her to the attention of Aaron Spelling.

Tewes was cast for the role of cruise director Julie McCoy on The Love Boat, selected from more than 100 actresses who auditioned. She starred in the third and final pilot of the show, cast the day before production began on the RMS Queen Mary in Long Beach. Tewes recalls the pilot episode:

"I had to borrow money to get a new tire, because my ’62 Volkswagen Bug was not going to get to San Pedro…. That first day, standing there in the little outfit, and I had to say, ”Hi, welcome aboard, I’m Julie McCoy, your cruise director” a gazillion times. But I kept screwing it up and saying, ”Hi, welcome aboard, I’m Julie MacLeod…” because I was talking to Gavin MacLeod and I was so excited."

In parallel, Tewes appeared in 1979 TV film Dallas Cowboys Cheerleaders alongside Jane Seymour and made her film debut in the 1981 movie Eyes of a Stranger, which co-starred a young Jennifer Jason Leigh.

In 1984, after seven seasons on The Love Boat, Tewes was replaced after a highly public battle with cocaine addiction, which she eventually overcame. She did reprise her role as a guest in a 1985 episode, and in the TV movies in the 1986–87 season.

Tewes was cast in a 1985 CBS sitcom pilot Anything for Love. The pilot aired as a special that summer, but was not picked up as a series. She went on to star in classic 1980s TV series My Two Dads, The New Mike Hammer, Murder, She Wrote, T.J. Hooker and Hunter.

In 1994, Tewes moved to Seattle and focused on regional theatre acting and directing across the country. In Seattle, she performed with the Tacoma Actors Guild and the Seattle Repertory Theatre.   As well as doing voice-overs for commercials, Tewes continued her TV career and appeared in a 1998 episode of Love Boat: The Next Wave, a-two season revival of the series.  In 2000–01, she had a recurring role as a police detective on The Fugitive.

Tewes plays Maxine Murdoch in the Imagination Theatre comedy-mystery radio series Murder and the Murdochs, which debuted in 2020. She has also played roles in episodes of other radio series on Imagination Theatre.

Culinary school 
Tewes attended culinary school to become a cheese specialist and works as a sous-chef for a catering company in Seattle when not acting.

Personal life 
Tewes has been married three times, first to John Wassel, a TV commercials director, then to Paolo Nonnis, an Italian drummer, and finally stage actor Robert Nadir. In 1987, she suffered the loss of her one month-old daughter, born prematurely.

References

External links
 
 
 

Living people
Actors from Whittier, California
Actresses from Pennsylvania
American film actresses
American people of German descent
American stage actresses
American television actresses
American voice actresses
People from Braddock, Pennsylvania
University of California, Riverside alumni
People from Whittier, California
20th-century American actresses
21st-century American women
Year of birth missing (living people)